Saraks (from Sanskrit Śrāvaka) is a community in Jharkhand, Bihar, Bengal, and Orissa. They have been followers of some aspects of Jainism, such as vegetarianism, since ancient times, however, were isolated and separated from the main body of the Jain community in western, northern, and southern India and have been Hindu Bengalis ever since. The governments of India and West Bengal both have classified some of the Saraks under Other Backward Classes since 1994 but many of them have been in the General category from the beginning itself.

History

The Saraks are an ancient community in Jharkhand and Bengal. British anthropologist Edward Tuite Dalton noted that according to the Bhumij tradition in Singhbhum district, the Saraks were early settlers in the region. According to Santosh Kumar Kundu, the Saraks arrived from the northwestern region of India, presently in Gujarat and Uttar Pradesh. In the region between the rivers Barakar and Damodar, two democratic republics, Shikharbhum and Panchakot, flourished. Later they merged and came to be known as Shikharbhum, with the capital at Panchkot. According to Ramesh Chandra Majumder, the Jain scholar Bhadrabahu, the second Louhacharya and the author of Kalpa Sutra may have come from the Sarak community. 

The region is called Vajjabhumi in ancient texts because diamonds were once mined in the region. The Tirthankara Mahavira visited this region according to the Kalpa Sūtra.

Separation and rediscovery

The Saraks lost contact with Jains in the rest of India after its conquest by Ikhtiyar Uddin Muhammad bin Bakhtiyar Khilji. Contact with the Digambara Bundelkhand Jains was reestablished when the Parwars Manju Chaudhary (1720–1785) was appointed the governor of Cuttack by the Maratha Empire.

Saraks are concentrated in Purulia, Bankura and Burdwan district of West Bengal and Ranchi, Dumka and Giridih districts and Singhbhum region of Jharkhand. The Saraks belonging to most of Jharkhand and West Bengal are Bengali speakers while those living in historical Singhbhum region speak Singhbhumi Odia. Educated Saraks speak fluent English.

In 2009, more than 165 Sarak Jains living in parts of West Bengal, Jharkhand and Bihar visited the ancient Jain pilgrimage center of Shravanabelagola. A special function to welcome the Sarak Jains was organised at Shravanabelagola.

See also
 Śrāvaka (Jainism)
 Jainism in Bengal
 Basudih
 Purulia
 Maji (surname)

Pakbirra, Purulia Temples and Sculptures

References

Indian Jains
Social groups of West Bengal
Jain communities
Vegetarian communities